Malika Askari Randhawa is an Indian actress of Bollywood who is known by the mononym Malika. She is the wife of wrestler and actor Randhawa and sister of actress Mumtaz.

Filmography

Personal life
She was married to Dara Singh's brother, Randhawa, and has two children, son Shaad Randhawa, who is an actor and a daughter Shehnaz.

References

External links

Living people
20th-century Indian actresses
Actresses in Hindi cinema
Indian film actresses
People from Jamshedpur
Actresses from Jharkhand
Year of birth missing (living people)